Cantabrian or Cantabrians may refer to:
People and things related to the modern Spanish autonomous community and historical region of Cantabria
Cantabrian people, modern inhabitants of Cantabria
Basques, as they were sometimes referred during Modern Age
Cantabrian Mountains, mountain range in Northern Spain
Cantabrian Sea, southern end of the Bay of Biscay
Cantabrian dialect, also known as montañés, a transition dialect between Asturleonese and Spanish, spoken in northern Spain
Cantabri, the ancient Celtic inhabitants of Cantabria
Cantabrian Wars, war during the Roman conquest of the ancient Cantabria and Asturias
Cantabrian circle, a military tactic employed by ancient Cantabri horse archers
People from the region of Canterbury, New Zealand

See also
Cantabrigian
Cantabria

Language and nationality disambiguation pages

Cantabria